Koumanthio Zeinab Diallo (born 1956) is a Guinean poet, novelist and playwright who writes in both French and Fulani.

Life
Koumanthio Zeinab Diallo was born in 1956 in Labé, Guinea.

She has also worked as an agricultural engineer.

In 2002 she and Bonata Dieng founded the Fouta Djallon Museum in Labé.

Works
 Moi, femme (Me, a woman), 1994.
 Pellun Gondhi, Guinée: Éditions Ganndal, 1996
 Les épines de l'amour (The Thorns of Love), Paris: L'Harmattan, 1997
 Pour les oiseaux du ciel et de la terre (For the birds of heaven and earth), UNICEF, 1997
 Comme les pétales du crépuscule (Like Petals at Dawn), Lomé: La Semeuse, 1998.
 Comme une colombe en furie, poésie pour enfants (Like a dove in fury, poetry for children), éditions Linda, 1999
 La morte de la guerre (The dead of war), 2000.
 Daado l'orpheline et autres contes du Fouta Djallon de Guinée (Daado the orphan girl, and other stories of the Guinea's Fouta Djallon), Paris: L'Harmattan, 2004
 Le Fils du roi Guémé et autres contes du Fouta Djallon de Guinée (The son of the King of Guémé and other stories of Guinea's Fouta Djallon), Paris: L'Harmattan, 2004. With a preface by Bernard Salvaing.
 Les rires du silence (The Joys of Silence), Paris: L'Harmattan, 2005
 Les humiliées (Humiliated Women), Paris: L'Harmattan, 2005.
 Ngôtté-le-génie de la chasse - conte du Fouta Djallon en Guinée (Ngôtté the hunting genius - a story of the Guinea's Fouta Djallon), Paris: L'Harmattan, 2007
 Les fous du septième ciel: Au-dela de l’excision (The madmen of the seventh heaven: Beyond circumcision), Silex/Nouvelles du Sud, 2014

References

External links
 African Moon by Koumanthio Zeinab Diallo, translated by Janis A. Mayes

1956 births
Living people
Guinean women writers
Guinean novelists
Guinean poets
Guinean dramatists and playwrights
Agricultural engineers
Guinean engineers
Women novelists
Guinean women poets
Women dramatists and playwrights
Guinean women engineers
20th-century poets
20th-century novelists
20th-century dramatists and playwrights
20th-century women writers
20th-century engineers
21st-century poets
21st-century novelists
21st-century dramatists and playwrights
21st-century women writers
21st-century engineers
People from Labé
20th-century women engineers
21st-century women engineers